Albion Market was a British soap opera, set in a covered market in Salford, in the northwest of England. It was intended as a companion to fellow ITV soap Coronation Street, starting at 7:00 pm on Fridays and 7.15 pm on Sundays. However, due to continued troubles and ratings competition from the BBC's  Open All Hours, the series was only broadcast for one year; a Friday episode of Coronation Street would be introduced in October 1989.

History
Albion Market launched in August 1985, four months before Coronation Street celebrated its 25th anniversary. As with Coronation Street, Granada Studios dubbed it a "continuing drama series", considering the term "soap opera" to be derogatory. The show ran twice weekly on Friday and Sunday night; at the time, 7.00 pm on Fridays and 7.15 pm on Sundays were considered "graveyard slots", usually broadcasting game shows (although these were often very popular) or American imports. Very quickly, the Sunday episodes were moved back to around 6.00 pm, and LWT and TVS, who felt that ITV's network schedules had too much of a Northern bias, later dropped the Friday episode and instead broadcast a double bill of the series at 5.00 pm on Sundays. At the series' launch, the chairman of Granada Television claimed that "When Coronation Street celebrates its Golden anniversary, Albion Market will be celebrating its silver anniversary". Despite this, the show lasted for only one year.

The show received negative reviews from critics and did not do well in the ratings. Many noted that the actual storyline rarely strayed from the confines of the market itself. The long-suffering market superintendent Derek Owen (David Hargeaves) was the primary focus; his day usually began with the difficult task of assigning the few unowned stalls to the large number of casual traders. Prominent among these were Lynn Harrison (Noreen Kershaw) and her ex-convict husband Roy (Jonathan Barlow); regular traders included the gossiping ceramics dealer Morris Ransome (Bernard Spear) and handsome lothario and cake seller Tony Fraser (John Michie).

The series struggled to attract a sizeable audience. Characters were bogged down by the business of running their stalls, and the sheer drabness of the set compounded the monotony. After this faltering start, compounded by Michael Grade's success with his newly rearranged schedules for the BBC, Granada attempted to change direction and bring in both glamour and familiar actors. Despite attempts to encourage viewing figures by bringing in Till Death Us Do Part actor Antony Booth and singer Helen Shapiro, the ratings did not improve, and some ITV regions dropped the series from their peak-time schedules. The show was cancelled after just 100 episodes. For many years, the outdoor location with its distinctive arch-shaped Albion Market sign above the River Irwell remained intact. When the Granada Tours Experience was closed in 1999, the sign was removed, and the building which was once Albion Market was sold. It now forms part of the Victoria and Albert Hotel.

Cast

 David Hargreaves as Derek Owen, market superintendent
 Derek Hicks as Keith Naylor, superintendent's assistant
 Noreen Kershaw as Lynne Harrison, stallholder
 Jonathan Barlow as Roy Harrison, stallholder
 Sally Baxter as Lisa O'Shea, stallholder
 Bernard Spear as Morris Ransome, stallholder
 Carol Kaye as Miriam Ransome, stallholder
 Geoffrey Leesley as Geoff Travis, stallholder
 John Michie as Tony Fraser, stallholder
 Valerie Lilley as Brenda Rigg, stallholder
 Peter Benson as Larry Rigg, stallholder
 Alistair Walker as Duane Rigg, Brenda and Larry's son
 Paul Bhattacharjee as Jaz Sharma, stallholder
 Dev Sagoo as Raju Sharma, stallholder
 Pik-Sen Lim as Ly Nhu Chan, stallholder
 Philip Tan as Lam Quoc Hoa, stallholder
 Linda Polan as Maureen Nicholls, stallholder
 Liam Flannery as Billy Nicholls, stallholder
 Howard Lloyd-Lewis as Ralph Jessup, Maureen and Billy's uncle
 Barbara Wilshere as Carol Broadbent, cafe assistant
 Burt Caesar as Phil Smith, chef
 Paula Jacobs as Peggy Sagar, cafe manager
 Helen Shapiro as Viv Harker
 Jane Hazlegrove as Debbie Taylor
 Nimmy March as Collette Harrison
 Avis Bunnage as Annie Naylor
 Lill Roughley as Barbara Owen 
 Kelly Lawrence as Louise Todd
 Arthur Kelly as Dermot Thornburgh
 Antony Booth as Ted Pilkington
 Simon Rouse as Alan Curtis
 Souad Faress as Anita Rai
 Seeta Indrani as Sita Sharma
 Jamila Massey as Susha Sharma
 Rebecca Lock as Jenny McMullen
 David Phelan as Sean Ellison
 Paul Beringer as Paul O'Donnell 
 Marie Jelliman as Mary Houlihan
 Andy Rashleigh as Colin Arnold 
 Henry Moxon as Simon Walker 
 Duane Mills as Gregory Dickson
 Martin Oldfield as Howard Dickinson 
 David Boyce as Ralph Friend  
 Hetta Charnley as Janet Owen  
 Rashid Karapiet as Narya Vyas 
 Jane Karen as Carrie Mullen

Episodes

References

External links

1980s British television soap operas
1985 British television series debuts
1985 British television series endings
ITV soap operas
Television series by ITV Studios
Television shows set in Manchester
English-language television shows
Television shows produced by Granada Television